Aya Tanimura is an Australian-Japanese writer and director, based in Los Angeles, California.

Career

Short films
Her directorial credits include Mobius (2011), U-2074 (2010), and Mrs. Kim, (2010) which was a finalist in Los Angeles Magazine's Get L.A. short film competition. Also produced in 2010,  Tanimura's film Sweet-As won the People's Choice award and was a finalist for Tourism New Zealand's '100% Pure New Zealand Presents Your Big Break' short film competition. In 2013, Tanimura produced Kill of the Night under Visual Communications' Armed With a Camera fellowship which premiered at the Los Angeles Asian Pacific Film Festival  and later screened at the Lady Filmmakers Film Festival.

Music videos
In 2013, Tanimura directed lyric videos for Katy Perry's songs "Roar" and "Unconditionally".

In 2014, she directed Perry's lyric video for "Birthday" which was one of the 2014 MTV VMA nominees for "Best Lyric Video."

In 2016 she directed Alessia Cara's music video for "How Far I'll Go".

In 2017, she directed Perry's lyric video for "Chained to the Rhythm".

See also
 List of film and television directors
 List of people from Los Angeles

References

External links 
 , her official website
 
 Aya Tanimura's Vimeo profile

Year of birth missing (living people)
20th-century births
Australian expatriates in the United States
Australian film producers
Australian music video directors
Australian film directors
Australian women film directors
Australian women screenwriters
Female music video directors
Film producers from California
Australian women film producers
Writers from Los Angeles
Living people
21st-century Australian women writers
Film directors from Los Angeles
21st-century Australian screenwriters